"Words" is a song by Australian singer Kate Miller-Heidke, released on 26 May 2007 as the lead single from Miller-Heike's debut studio album Little Eve. The song peaked at number 43 on the ARIA Charts.

Music video
The music video was directed by Stephen Lance & Mairi Cameron HEAD PICTURES. It features Miller-Heidke in a white room with a typewriter, a small and condensed room and a room with her trying to babysit a young boy. All of these rooms have numerous words written all over the walls. In the second half of the video, we see Miller-Heidke wearing a purple dress with flashing lights from Cameras.

Katemillerheidke words
A live version of "Words" is featured on Miller-Heidke's 2009 live release, Live at The Hi-Fi. This version sees the song mashed up with Rage Against the Machine's 1992's Protest Anthem "Killing in the Name".

Track listing
CD Single
 "Words" (radio mix)
 "Words" (album mix)
 "We're Gonna Need Love"

Charts

External links
 'Words' Music Video

References

2007 singles
Kate Miller-Heidke songs
Songs written by Keir Nuttall
2007 songs
Sony BMG singles
Song recordings produced by Magoo (Australian producer)